George William Milburn (24 June 1910 – 24 June 1980) was an English footballer who played for Leeds United and Chesterfield.

Biography
Milburn was a member of the famous Milburn footballing family. His cousin Jackie, known as Wor Jackie, played for Newcastle United. Other members of the Milburn family included brothers Jack (Leeds United and Bradford City), Jim (Leeds United and Bradford Park Avenue) and Stan (Chesterfield, Leicester City and Rochdale).

External links
Leeds United profile

1910 births
1980 deaths
Sportspeople from Ashington
English footballers
Leeds United F.C. players
Chesterfield F.C. players
English Football League players
Association football defenders
Footballers from Northumberland